Volleyball at the 2010 Summer Youth Olympics took place at the Toa Payoh Sports Hall in Singapore.

Preliminary round

Group A

|}

|}

Group B

|}

|}

Semi-finals

|}

5th-place match

|}

Bronze-medal match

|}

Final

|}

Medalists

References
 Preliminary Round Summary
 Final Round Summary

Volleyball at the 2010 Summer Youth Olympics